Haus Konstruktiv, or Museum Haus Konstruktiv, is an arts foundation founded by private individuals in 1986 in Zürich, Switzerland. 

From 1987 to spring 2001, it was located at Seefeldstrasse 317 in the outer Seefeld area of Zurich and was known as the "House for Constructive and Concrete Art". The new premises are close to the centre of Zurich at Selnaustrasse 25, in a former power station building.

The foundation promotes "constructive, concrete, and conceptual art and design". The Zurich Art Prize was founded in 2007 by the Museum Haus Konstruktiv together with the Zurich Insurance Group.

References

External links

Haus Konstruktiv website

Museums in Zürich
Art museums and galleries in Switzerland